The Michigan Department of Corrections (MDOC) oversees prisons and the parole and probation population in the state of Michigan, United States. It has 31 prison facilities, and a Special Alternative Incarceration program, together composing approximately 41,000 prisoners. Another 71,000 probationers and parolees are under its supervision. (2015 figures) The agency has its headquarters in Grandview Plaza in Lansing.

History

MDOC previously contracted with Aramark for its food services. On July 13, 2015 it announced that it was switching to Trinity Services Group.

Divisions

Correctional Facilities Administration
The Correctional Facilities Administration (CFA) is responsible for the state's prisons and camps, including the Special Alternative Incarceration (boot camp). CFA has administrative offices in Lansing where a Deputy Director oversees the network of secure facilities. The network is divided into two regions, and each region has a Regional Prison Administrator who has oversight over wardens. At the local level, the wardens oversee daily operations of the prisons and camps. CFA also manages several peripheral aspects of facility operation, including prisoner transportation, food service and classification.

The state secure-facilities network supervises a diverse offender population. The physical plants also span centuries, from the Michigan Reformatory in Ionia (built in the late 1870s) to the modern Bellamy Creek Correctional Facility, which was completed in 2001.

Prisons 

As of January 2017, thirty-one DOC facilities are open and in operation.

The prisons are categorized into different security levels. A Secure Level I facility houses prisoners who are more easily managed within the network (even though they may have committed violent crimes). The state's Level V prisons house prisoners who pose maximum management problems, are a maximum security risk, or both. Some prisoners may have more than one security level.

Field Operations Administration
The Field Operations Administration (FOA) is responsible for state probation and parole supervision as well as other methods of supervision, including the parole board. It also oversees the Detroit Detention Center and the Detroit Reentry Center. There are 105 field offices across the state.

Operations Support Administration
The Operations Support Administration is responsible for oversight of departmental finances, personnel services - including training and recruitment of new employees, policy development, labor relations, and physical plant and environmental services.

See also

List of law enforcement agencies in Michigan
List of Michigan state prisons

National:
List of United States state correction agencies

References

External links
 Michigan Department of Corrections
  (PDF file)

State corrections departments of the United States
Department of Corrections
Corrections
Penal system in Michigan
1953 establishments in Michigan